Nagen Tamang (born 19 February, 1989 in Kurseong) is an Indian professional footballer who plays as a forward.

Career

Rangdajied United
Tamang made his professional debut for Rangdajied in the I-League on 4 October 2013 against Dempo at the Jawaharlal Nehru Stadium, Shillong; in which he played till the 76th minute before being replaced by Laldingngheta; as Rangdajied drew the match 2–2.

Transport United
In 2017, Tamang joined Bhutan National League side Transport United. On 7 August 2018 he scored a goal against Paro United.On 9 August 2017 he scored a hat-trick against Thimphu City and led his side to  a 6-3 win that placed his side three goals ahead of Thimphu City and on the top of the table..He became an inevitable ingredient of the side which eventually won the silverware. The  2017 Bhutan National Leaguetitle triumph gave Tamang’s CV a necessary kick which was missing earlier in his career.

Real Kashmir
On 26 August 2018, Nagen Tamang signed for newly promoted side Real Kashmir F.C. for season 2018-19 in the I-League.

On 11 December 2018, he scored a goal against Shillong Lajong, his first goal in the I-League. Real Kashmir won the match 6–1 and Nagen was adjudged as the Hero of the match.

Career statistics

Honours

Club

Transport United
Bhutan National League (1): 2017

See also
 List of Indian football players in foreign leagues

References

Real Kashmir FC players

External links 
 Goal Profile

1989 births
Living people
People from Darjeeling district
Footballers from West Bengal
Indian Gorkhas
Indian footballers
Rangdajied United F.C. players
I-League players
Royal Wahingdoh FC players
Association football forwards
Indian expatriate footballers
Expatriate footballers in Bhutan
Transport United F.C. players
I-League 2nd Division players
Tamang people